Bruno Otto Fleischer (2 May 1874 – 26 March 1965) was a German ophthalmologist.

Kayser-Fleischer rings and Fleischer rings are named for him.

References

Further reading

German ophthalmologists
1965 deaths
1874 births
Eye color